Carlisle United Football Club is a professional association football club based in Carlisle, Cumbria, England. They have played their home games at Brunton Park since 1909. The club's traditional kit is blue with white and red detail, whilst the badge takes elements from the city's coat of arms by including two wyverns. They are nicknamed the "Blues", due to their kit, as well as the "Cumbrians". The club is the closest English professional football club to the Anglo-Scottish border.

Formed in 1904, the club entered the Lancashire Combination the following year and were crowned Division Two champions in 1906–07. They entered the North Eastern League in 1910 and went on to win the league title in 1921–22, before being elected into the Football League in 1928. They spent the next 30 years in the Third Division North, at which point they were assigned a place in the newly formed Fourth Division, from where they won promotion in 1961–62. Relegated the following season, they then won two consecutive promotions, finishing the 1964–65 season as champions of the Third Division under the stewardship of Alan Ashman. They secured promotion out of the Second Division in 1973–74, but stayed only one season in the First Division and were relegated back to the Third Division at the end of the 1976–77 campaign. Promoted again under Bob Stokoe in 1981–82, they suffered successive relegations to return to the fourth tier by 1987.

Carlisle won promotion as champions of the fourth tier in 1994–95, but were relegated the next season, before winning promotion again in 1996–97, only to be relegated again the following year. Their 76-year stay in the Football League came to an end with relegation in 2003–04, though player-manager Paul Simpson secured an immediate return after leading United to victory in the 2005 Conference National play-off Final. They then won the League Two title in 2005–06, and remained in League One until their relegation at the end of the 2013–14 season. The club has reached the final of the Football League Trophy six times, more than any other team, winning it in 1997 and 2011, and finishing as runners-up in 1995, 2003, 2006 and 2010.

History

1896–1904: Shaddongate United
Shaddongate United F.C. are first reported in 1896 as the winners of the Carlisle Association Charity Shield and are recorded as playing at Willow Holme in the Shaddongate area of the city, now an industrial estate, and wearing blue and gold stripes. At the time Carlisle Red Rose and Carlisle AFC were the pre-eminent clubs in Carlisle but the new club quickly gained a following and by the time Carlisle AFC folded in 1899 they were considered a force to be reckoned with. By 1903 they had overtaken Red Rose and were further cemented as the city's biggest club when Red Rose's entire team were banned for four months by the Cumberland Football Association for taking part in a Scottish amateur tournament in contravention of league rules.

A myth has persisted that Shaddongate and Red Rose had merged to form Carlisle United and this likely led the club to adopt 1904 as their official date of foundation, though Red Rose continued until 1906 at which point they folded. Only in 2017 did more information about the early part of their history come to light.

1904–1928: Carlisle United
On 17 May 1904 at Shaddongate United's annual general meeting the club's members voted to change the team's name to Carlisle United at a heated meeting in Caldewgate, and it wasn't without its detractors. In fact, a breakaway group decided that Shaddongate United should live on and they continued to play under that name. However, they didn't have much of a local impact and their exploits have also been lost in the fullness of time.. The initial idea having been proposed by Newcastle United officials who felt it would aid them when applying to regional football leagues if they represented the entire city. At the time they played at Milhome Bank and later at Devonshire Park, finally settling at their current home Brunton Park in 1909. The first ever recorded fixture that United played was on 1 September 1904 when they entertained Victoria Wanderers, another Carlisle based side, in a friendly. Wanderers would go on to win the game, played at Millholme Bank,  2-1 and, unfortunately, the scorer of that historic goal has been lost to history with his name never having been recorded.

The first ever Saturday match for Carlisle United was on 3 September 1904, and it ended in victory with a 3-1 win over Hexham. 7 days later it was Maxwelltown, just across the border, who played host in a thrilling 3-3 draw that saw both sides take and lose the lead. A final nail in the coffin for Shaddongate came when the new Carlisle United entered the Cumberland Senior League. The division had just the 6 teams (including fierce rivals Carlisle Red Rose) and it was to be the Roses who would inflict a first league defeat on United when they beat them 2-0 at Boundary Road.  Revenge would be gained a month later when United went to the Roses ground at Maryport Cottages and beat them 2-1 in another nip and tuck match.

It was in this 1904/05 season that Carlisle United entered the FA Cup for the first time. They were drawn to play against Workington who were, at that time, the top side in Cumbria. In fact, so good were thay that they comfortably held their own in the Lancashire Combination League. The Cup game ended in a 2-2 draw with the West Cumbrians running out as 3-1 winners in the replay. In the Cumberland Cup United started by knocking out Frizington White Star, followed by Workington and then Keswick in the Semi-Final. The Final, played on the Warwick Road ground, brought United and Red Rose together again, and it was the newer of the two sides who would come out on top. The 2-0 win not only handed them the Cumberland Cup, but also confirmed them as the first side to ever achieve the League and Cup double.

The remainder of the season for United was a series of friendly matches against the likes of Accrington, Darlington and Newcastle United. On Good Friday 1905 club officials pulled off a real coup when they managed to persuade Glasgow Rangers to come to the City for a game. The match was played at Warwick Road in front of a healthy crowd of 3000, but the Gers won 2-1. Having won both the Cumberland Senior League and the Cumberland Cup in their inaugural season and been very impressed with what they had seen and heard of the Lancashire Combination League, United went in search of approval for admittance on 3 May 1905.  After a two week wait the request was rubber stamped and, along with Burnley, Bolton and Lancaster, United stepped up to a higher level of football, successfully applying  to be admitted to the Second Division of the Lancashire Combination but were only admitted after agreeing to pay all visiting teams’ travel expenses for two years, due to Carlisle not being located in Lancashire. It was though a bold step for the Carlisle club who had to agree to pay the train fares for the visiting team for two seasons as well as providing them with a tea. The success of 1904-05 had resulted in the club's bank balance increasing from £24 to £90 despite the outlay of £52 on player's wages, an early sign of professionalism in the ranks. Yet this balance and more was needed to develop a new and better ground at Devonshire Park, situated off Lismore Place and Catholic Lane. A new stand seating 800 was erected and banking erected all around the playing area. The aim, as it was reported to the club's AGM, was to improve the game in the Border City. The Lancashire Combination had begun life back in 1891 with the Second Division being established in 1903. Though almost entirely composed of clubs in Lancashire, Workington had been admitted in 1904 so United were guaranteed at least one local derby fixture.

The new season's preparations also included moves to strengthen the playing staff. Several players were recruited from other local sides, not least Carlisle Red Rose who had severe financial difficulties. Other players came from further afield including Tom Smith who arrived as both player and trainer from Preston North End, had also played for Tottenham with whom he had won an FA Cup winners medal in 1901. The Lancashire Combination era began on 2 September 1905 at home to St Helens Town. Despite two goals from Smith, the visitors won 3-2. The next game at home to Blackpool Reserves was lost 5-1 and despite a first win at Burnley, Carlisle then crashed 8-1 at Clitheroe in what proved to be almost the worst defeat of the season. Soon afterwards a new goalkeeper, James Scott, was signed from Barnsley and immediately results began to improve. Carlisle were able to sustain a mid table position for most of the season. A rare lapse came on 2 January 1906 when the trip to Brynn Central ended in an 8-0 rout, the biggest defeat of the campaign. The most convincing victory had come a week earlier on Christmas Day 1905 when Hyde St George's were thrashed 10-2. Not surprisingly Hyde were to finish bottom of the table although it was reported rather unsurprisingly that they were 'somewhat short of their strongest side' when they arrived in Carlisle. Despite this fact, a total crowd of 11,310 watched the two home games on Christmas Day and Boxing Day while a further 1,000 were said to have been admitted without paying after forcing entry into the ground.

Carlisle finished the season in thirteenth place among the nineteen teams in the Combination. The campaign ended with four successive home matches, the last of these being the local derby with Workington. Though Carlisle were safely placed in mid table, Workington were near the top and in with a real chance of promotion to Division One. The teams had met a month earlier in Carlisle's last away match of the season which saw the Reds win 3-1. The return match at Devonshire Park attracted a gate in excess of 10,000 with receipts of no less than £208 thanks to increased admission prices. The match ended 1-1 and Workington eventually missed promotion by a single point. Financial troubles had caused Carlisle Red Rose to resign from the Cumberland Senior League the previous summer. Fortunately they were later readmitted, playing their home games at the Milholme Bank ground that had just been vacated by United. The two sides were then drawn together in the FA Cup First Preliminary Round. Carlisle United won 3-0 at Devonshire Park before losing at Barrow in the next round. It was not until the end of the season that the City's two leading sides met again. By that time Red Rose had won the Cumberland Cup Final, beating Frizington White Star who had just pipped them for the Cumberland League title. On 30 April 1906 United and Red Rose met in a friendly match in aid of the Red Rose club. The result was a 1-1 draw.

After the league reorganised four years later the board at United decided it did not suit the club's best interests to be there any longer and the club entered the North Eastern League in place of their reserve team who had previously played in the league and been a founding member. When the Carlisle United first team left to join the Football League the reserve team resumed its place in the competition. Carlisle United were crowned champions of the North Eastern League in 1922.

The 1927–28 season was Carlisle's last in the North Eastern League. An excellent home record helped them to second in the table finishing a full 10 points behind Champions Sunderland Reserves. The close season meant the usual round of applications to join (and be re-elected to) the Football League. Carlisle went up against Chester, Durham City (applying for re-election), Nelson and York City. On 4 June 1928 a delegation of representatives from Carlisle United took their seats at the Football League meeting in London to hear the results of the vote. Carlisle received the second-most votes with 33, and replaced Durham City, who had received just 11 votes, as members of the Football League.

1928–1964: Football League
Carlisle United won their first League fixture Football League Third Division North in August 1923 with the side of Prout, Coulthard, Cook, Harrison, Ross, Pigg, Agar, Hutchison, McConnell, Ward and Watson beating Accrington Stanley 3–2. Their next game a week later was played against Hartlepool United and still stands to this day as their record victory at 8 goals to nil, though it was later equalled on Christmas Day 1952 when Scunthorpe were beaten by the same score. Carlisle finished in eighth place in their inaugural campaign which proved to be the best in the pre-war era. In 1934/35 the Club finished bottom of the table and had to seek re-election for the only time.

When the Second World War began in 1939, Carlisle United withdrew from national and regional competitions and only played local football. When the war was over the club returned to the Football League and appointed Ivor Broadis as player-manager, making him the youngest league club manager in history. He then had the distinction of becoming the first manager to transfer himself when he moved to Sunderland, he continued to live and train in Carlisle. Broadis returned to Carlisle United in 1955 an ex-England international.

In 1949, the club became the first to appoint Bill Shankly as manager. Shankly, a former player at Carlisle, later went on to manage local rivals Workington (helping them finish above Carlisle for the first time) before being appointed as manager of Liverpool in 1959; over the next 15 years he would guide that club to numerous trophy successes. It is at Carlisle where he met local player Geoff Twentyman, who he would later sign as head scout at Liverpool, and lifelong friend Ivor Broadis. Broadis, who was playing for Sunderland but living and training with Carlisle, once arrived late for training and Shankly asserted that he would play by United's training rules even if he didn't play there. According to Shankly, he said to Broadis: "What do you think you're doing? Who do you think you are? If you do the training we do you can train with us and we'll play five-a-side and you'll run your guts out as an example to everybody else".

Carlisle were members of the Third Division North until 1958 when it combined with the Third Division South to become the Fourth Division. They remained there until 1962 when they won their first promotion, they were relegated the following season but immediately bounced back to begin the most prosperous period in the club's history.

1964–1985: Golden era
Upon gaining promotion to the Third Division in 1964 United immediately won the Third Division Championship the following year. In the period which followed Carlisle enjoyed their greatest success outside of cup competitions. Over twelve years the club cemented themselves as a solid Second Division (Then 2nd Tier in English football) side. Within that period Carlisle finished 7 out of 11 seasons in the top half of the table including 3rd in 66/67, 4th in 70/71 and a 3rd in 73/74 which saw them promoted to the top tier of English football. The end of the 71/72 season also saw Carlisle play their only European competition in the club's history, the Anglo-Italian Cup, and in June 1972 they beat A.S. Roma 3–2 at the Stadio Olimpico in Rome.

Playing in the First Division for the 1974–75 season, Carlisle won their first three fixtures to go top of the English football pyramid, partly due to the likes of Chris Balderstone, scoring the penalty which put them at the top, and Bobby Parker who both went on to make at least 375 league appearances for Carlisle. The success was short lived however, they finished the season in bottom place and were relegated. Highlight victories include doing a double over Everton, and home victories over eventual champions Derby County, and former title holders Ipswich Town, Arsenal, Burnley, Tottenham Hotspur and Wolverhampton Wanderers.

Bill Shankly, an FA Cup and League Championship winning manager by that time, branded Carlisle's climb to the top as "the greatest feat in the history of the game."

After Carlisle’s brief taste of life in the First Division, the Club found themselves struggling in Division Two, and another relegation followed in 76/77 returning to the Third Division first time in 13 years.

Their top-flight journey three years earlier had faded into memory and, though a handful of their First Division squad remained, these were not such glorious times for the Cumbrians. It was Bobby Moncur’s first full season in charge in 1977/78, the Newcastle legend having succeeded reluctant boss Dick Young the previous autumn. Carlisle never managed to hit any sort of winning stride and found their campaign studded with draws. The FA Cup had brought some respite from the mundane, Carlisle encountered Manchester United after a decent spell of winter form. A 1-1 draw at Brunton Park is also remembered for the controversial decision not to award the Blues a second-half penalty, and eventually they bowed out with a 4-2 defeat in the Old Trafford replay. By the spring they had also seen the departure of their most dangerous player: striker Billy Rafferty, who was sold to Wolves. United had replaced him with Portsmouth’s David Kemp. Carlisle would settle the season with a 13th-placed finish.

After another campaign in the Third Division finishing sixth place in the 1978/79 season. Carlisle went into the start of the 1979/80 season struggling for consistency but looked to climb up the divisions with 22-year-old York City striker Gordon Staniforth arriving for £120,000 in October, making him the club’s most expensive purchase at the time. Staniforth would join Paul Bannon and the emerging Peter Beardsley with a fresh attacking impetus. By the time Sheffield United visited in November in front of a 6,347 crowd they had found a degree of better form, winning 1-0. If these were new beginnings for Staniforth, though, they also proved the start of the end for Moncur. Three months after the Sheffield United win, the boss departed Brunton Park to take the top job at Hearts. That left Martin Harvey in caretaker and subsequently permanent charge as Carlisle finished sixth, the same as the previous season.

The 1980/81 season had started badly, it had been the first calendar year in which United had employed three different managers, Bob Moncur having left for Hearts in February, Martin Harvey steering the ship to September, then Bob Stokoe moving back in for a second spell. Carlisle hit by some key departures including Mike McCartney, Steve Ludlam and the earlier exit of Phil Bonnyman. Carlisle hosted Burnley on Boxing Day in a 3-2 victory after a Gordon Staniforth hat-trick, ending a six-game winless run. Carlisle would avoid the drop into Division Four by just a single point finishing 19th place. Returning manager Bob Stokoe would trigger another revival at the Club a year later.

In 1982 Carlisle were again promoted to the Second Division under Stokoe, this time in Second place in the table after a 1-0 victory at Chester in their last game of the season. A four year sojourn in Division Two then followed, including the “nearly” season of 1983/84, when they just missed out on promotion to the top flight once again; after spending the majority of the season in a top three placing with a team including Malcolm Poskett and Tommy Craig they mounted a promotion challenge but finished 7th after a late slump.

1986–2005: Doldrums
Carlisle ended their most prosperous period as rapidly as it had started. Back to back relegations saw them drop into the Fourth Division in 1987 for the first time since 1964. Even back in the Fourth Division, fortunes did not initially start to improve. Attendance slumped to the lowest in the Club’s history and only 1,287 saw the League game against Chester in May 1987 and the introduction of automatic promotion/relegation to the Vauxhall Conference posed a new threat. Carlisle's first season in there saw them finish second from bottom but 19 points ahead of relegated Newport County meant no danger of relegation.

Carlisle's league form was improved after three awful seasons and they finished 12th in Division Four in 1988/89. They reached the FA Cup third round, where their run was ended by defending league champions and eventual FA Cup winners, Liverpool. Seventeen-year-old defender Steve Harkness was sold to Liverpool at the end of the season. His place in the team was filled by Middlesbrough's Paul Proudlock.

Carlisle's good progress continued into the new decade, but their play-off hopes were ended on the final day of the season by a 5-2 demolition at the hands of Maidstone United. This was a disappointing end to an encouraging season during which the Cumbrians had topped the 1989/90 Fourth Division on Christmas Day and for a while in January as well before a late slump in form cost them dearly. In the end they missed out on the play-offs due to inferior goal difference.

A promising start to the 1990/91 season suggested that the Cumbrians were finally on their way out of the Fourth Division, but a disastrous second half of the campaign saw them slump to 20th in the final table and cost manager Clive Middlemass his job in March. He was succeeded by Aidan McCaffrey, who was left needing a substantial overhaul to get Carlisle's fortunes back on track.

In 1992, Carlisle endured one of the worst seasons in their history as they finished bottom of the Fourth Division, but were lucky because the demise of Aldershot mid-season resulted in no relegation to the Conference taking place that year. A brief respite in Carlisle's decline then came when the club was taken over by Michael Knighton in the summer of 1992, the man who had made headlines in 1989 with his failed takeover bid for Manchester United became Chairman and Chief Executive of Carlisle United. Knighton purchased the entire Shareholding from the former Board of Directors, some 75.6% of the Club. The next three years saw a dramatic rise in the Club’s fortunes. From 1992 to 1996, some £4.5 million of investment had been provided to improve the Brunton Park Stadium. A new East Stand (6,000 All Seater) was opened by Nat Lofthouse in August 1996, as the first phase of the planned 28,000 All Seater Stadium. On October 1993 a Club record Transfer Fee was paid in the first three years of Knighton’s reign, acquiring a much-needed prolific goalscorer with the purchase of David Reeves for £121,000 from Notts County. The Club also broke its unbeaten run of games without defeat, by setting a new record of 19 games.

Before the 1993/94 season began, Michael Knighton announced his intention to deliver Premiership football to Carlisle by 2003. He re-organised the management team to appoint Mick Wadsworth as Director of Coaching, while David McCreery was given the role of head coach and 38-year-old goalkeeper Mervyn Day was named as assistant coach. This season was Carlisle's best in years, they won 10 of their final 14 league games to secure the final play-off place in the recently rebranded Division Three, a year after narrowly avoiding relegations but failed to gain promotion, though their promotion dream was ended by  losing to Wycombe Wanderers in the semi-finals.

The 1994/95 Season was one of the Club’s most memorable, with the club attaining only their second Championship in the club’s history by taking the Third Division Championship with a record number of points for the Club, with Carlisle gaining some 91 points for the League Championship. David Reeves scored 25 league goals to help Carlisle achieve long-awaited success ending their eight-year ordeal in the league's basement division. This Season also witnessed the Club’s first appearance at Wembley in the Auto Windscreens Shield Final against Birmingham City, with a record crowd, for this competition, of 76,663. A nail biting finish went into extra time and history was made again when the “Golden Goal” principle was used for the first time at Wembley to decide the winner, when Birmingham scored to gain a 1-0 victory.

In 1995/96 with new found Division 2 status Carlisle were favourites to win the Division 2 Championship. However, profound disappointment materialised during that Season, which culminated in a controversial relegation back to Division 3. The re-arranged Brighton vs York fixture was completed after the formal season had finished. York knowing in advance that they only needed to win or score 3 goals to survive the drop themselves; York won, 3-1 at the Goldstone Ground, sending United back to Division 3. Knighton threatened to sue the League, unless the Football League adopted a more acceptable Code of Practice, to avoid such occurrences in the future.  Mervyn Day became Director of Coaching following the departure of Mick Wadsworth, who left the Club in January 1996 for First Division Norwich City, only to remain for a few months at Norwich before he left by “mutual consent”; Wadsworth found himself back in the Third Division as Manager of Scarborough F.C.

The opening campaign of the 1996/97 Season suggested that the Club could well be in the running to bounce back to Second Division status at the first attempt. As predicted and anticipated at the end of 1996/97, the Club gained promotion at the first attempt and returned to Division 2 and gained an automatic promotion spot, Carlisle would finish 3rd behind Wigan Athletic and Fulham, Wigan going through as Champions. . However, although the team had started the campaign as the “fancied” favourites for the Championship, Carlisle were slightly disappointed in finishing in Third place, considering the calibre of the squad, but the fact that the end of season run-in only produced four wins from the last twelve games saw the team limp over the promotion line rather than finish with a flourish. Carlisle, also made their second visit in three years to Wembley, by reaching the Final against Colchester. A fairly tense, equal affair saw the game burst into life in extra time. The Match ended with a thrilling penalty shoot out, Carlisle found themselves trailing 3-1 on penalties until Cumbrian, Tony Caig, pulled off two truly brilliant penalty saves to leave the Club Captain, Steve Hayward, with the last penalty kick to score and carry the day. He scored to see the Club win 4-3 on penalties and make History for the club by lifting a Winners Trophy at the famous “Home of Football”, for the first time.

With promotion gained at the first attempt and returned to Second Division status for the 1997/98 season . The disappointing form from last season would continue, picking up just one win out of the first six games, and when one took the previous twelve games from last Season into account it showed a poor performance of picking up just five wins in eighteen matches. Mervyn Day was relieved of his duties, and the coaching team comprising Michael Knighton, David Wilkes and John Halpin took charge of First Team affairs. Paul Devlin was recruited as Community Officer in the place of John Halpin. The main objective for the new coaching staff for Season 1997/98 was to maintain Division Two status. Unfortunately this was not to be, and the Club finished 23rd on the table. Knighton sold the club soon afterwards, and Carlisle entered another period of strife and struggle.

In the 1998–99 season Carlisle found themselves in their second successive relegation battle. With Peter Beardsley still unable to make up his mind whether he wished to join Carlisle as team coach, it was left with the Wilkes and Halpin partnership to steer the club forward. After a mixed start the Team really began to play quite well throughout the end of September and October. In December Michael Knighton appointed former Middlesbrough captain, Nigel Pearson as Team Manager. Nigel Pearson came on strong recommendation to Carlisle with glowing references from the likes of Howard Wilkinson and Ron Atkinson, two of his former Managers. However, it is fair to describe that his period in charge as nothing short of disastrous, picking up just five wins from the 19th December 1999. Pearson obtained five wins out of some twenty-seven matches in charge.

No one could have predicted the climax to the end of yet another disappointing Season. The final game of the season created one of football’s golden folklore moments, “the great escape” game of 8 May 1999. Carlisle United needed to gain three points from the final game of the season at home to Plymouth Argyle to retain their League survival or be relegated from the Football League for the first time since 1928. Scarborough (Carlisle's relegation rival) merely needed to draw against Peterborough. News had already flashed through to Brunton Park that Scarborough had achieved all they needed to do, drawing against high flying Peterborough at the McAlpine Stadium 1-1 each. The score line remained 1-1 at Brunton Park on 90 minutes and the crowd at Scarborough were already celebrating before the fourth official stated four minutes of extra time would be played at Brunton Park. In the 95th minute of stoppage, goalkeeper Jimmy Glass, who had signed in an emergency loan deal from Swindon Town after the transfer deadline, sprinted from his goal line, arrived late in the box for a corner kick, Scott Dobie’s flashing header was parried by the Plymouth goalkeeper straight to the feet of Glass, who with the last kick in the game wasted no time in smashing the ball home in one of the most dramatic ends to a Season ever witnessed. All pandemonium broke loose, a high spirited mass pitch invasion took place, the referee was swamped in a good natured fashion, and at least three or four minutes lapsed before the referee was able to return the ball to the centre spot. The moment the referee blew the whistle to re-start the game, he also signalled the end of the Match, in a glorious survival and retention of Football League status for Carlisle. It was in many ways a fitting finish. There had been much criticism over the departure of local Goalkeeping hero Tony Caig, and the incoming goalkeeper saving the Club, to become a national star overnight and a folk hero amongst the greatest of Carlisle folk heroes of all time.

In June 1999, Michael Knighton resigned as Chairman and put his shareholding in CUFC Holdings Ltd up for sale. The forthcoming 1999-00 season produced yet another poor performance on the field of play. Despite one million pounds spent on players' wages and the club retaining one of the largest playing squads in the bottom two divisions, the club narrowly escaped relegation to the conference on goal difference. Carlisle lost their final game of the season 1-0 to Brighton but were kept up by Chester City's defeat at the hands of Peterborough United. Chester City lost their league status, relegated to be replaced by Conference Champions Kidderminster. Carlisle’s Team Coach, Neil Cooper had already left by early January and both replacement, Paul Baker and manager Martin Wilkinson followed suit by the end of the season.

Ian Atkins, the former Northampton Town and Chester City manager was appointed to manage team affairs for the 2000/01 campaign. Atkins was one of the most successful managers in the lower leagues,  and there was much hope that he could be the man to achieve promotion. But things didn't work out and they finished 22nd, just one place higher than in the previous two campaigns. In July, Atkins quit at the end of the season to take the Assistant Managers job at Cardiff and was succeeded by Roddy Collins who inspired Bohemians of Ireland to their historic UEFA Cup wins over Aberdeen and 1.FC Kaiserslautern.

In the 2001-02 season, the Blues just manage to avoid relegation at the expense of Barnet, safety was achieved in only the second to last game of the season. Carl Heggs scored the vital goal that secured the point needed in the away game at Lincoln City. The highlight of the season was the third round F.A Cup tie at home to Arsenal, the Blues made the Gunners work hard for a 1-0 victory and were unlucky not to grab a replay. Improved results on the pitch were overshadowed once again by off the field events which included a failed takeover attempt by Irish Businessman John Courtenay and in April Roddy Collins became the second manager to be dismissed that season by United following a series of outbursts which slammed the Directors of the club and overseeing Carlisle United’s worst start to a season in 46 years.

For the fourth time in five seasons, Carlisle narrowly avoided relegation in the 2002-03 season. This time 22nd place was just one place above the drop zone, as this was the first season in which two clubs were relegated to the Conference instead of just one.

After frequently in the struggle to avoid relegation to the Conference Carlisle were finally relegated in 2003-04 after 76 years in the Football League. Relegation had seemed inevitable since well before Christmas, with 18 of Carlisle's first 21 Division Three games ending in defeat. A revival followed from the next 25 fixtures under new player-manager Paul Simpson, 40 points from a possible 75 . Carlisle actually managed to finish second from bottom in the table after York City's failure to win any of their final 20 league games, with Carlisle's relegation being confirmed when they failed to win their penultimate game of the season.

2005–2012: Resurgence

Carlisle were promoted out of the non-league conference at the first time of asking in 2005, winning the play-off final at the Britannia Stadium, Stoke. Carlisle's excellent form under manager Paul Simpson continued into the following season as they returned to the Football League with a bang, clinching the League Two title. Simpson then departed for Preston North End, and was succeeded by Neil McDonald.

The following few seasons saw Carlisle achieve their highest league finishes for 22 years and the highest average crowds for 30 years. This coincided with several seasons at the top half of League One including a playoff finish in 2008.

In 2006/07 Carlisle became the first visiting team to win a League One match at the Keepmoat Stadium, the new home of Doncaster Rovers after a 2-1 win on February 3. The win was part of a sequence of games in which the club mired in mid-table staged a late run for a play-off place, they finally finished the season 8th, their highest league place for 20 years with the added bonus of returning their highest average league crowds for 30 years.

Carlisle started the 2007-08 season with a 1-1 draw at newly promoted Walsall but manager Neil McDonald was sacked on the Monday after the match. Greg Abbott took over as caretaker manager with Cheltenham Town manager John Ward taking over on a permanent basis in October 2007, with both clubs agreeing a six figure compensation package. Ward signed a four year deal. Ward took Carlisle to the top of League One on October 28 and they were still looking likely for automatic promotion at the beginning of April as they occupied second place but could only manage a draw on the final day of the season and finished fourth. On May 12, 2007, Carlisle United played Leeds United in the League One play-off first leg at Elland Road and won 2-1 with Danny Graham and Marc Bridge-Wilkinson scoring the goals. Dougie Freedman scored a controversial injury time goal (in the 96th minute; only 4 minutes were shown on the fourth official's board) for Leeds to set up an enthralling second leg. In the Brunton Park return, Leeds took an early first half lead through a Jonny Howson goal, and then Howson scored his second with only seconds to spare to put the match at 3-2 on aggregate to Leeds, meaning Carlisle would spend another season in the third tier of English football. Leeds were beaten by Doncaster in the play-off final.

The 2008–09 season saw Carlisle start promisingly but it was soon followed by one of the worst runs of form in the club's history. Because of this manager John Ward was sacked and replaced by caretaker manager Greg Abbott, signing him permanently after he uplifted the club's form in the following games. On 9 January 2009, Graham Kavanagh was released by Sunderland and returned to Carlisle on a permanent basis as a player-coach. Carlisle eventually avoided relegation that season.

Carlisle completed two full seasons with Abbot at the helm, and achieved comfortable mid-table finishes in both. More noteworthy were the two runs in the Football League Trophy which took place in those seasons. The team were beaten in the final in 2010 but returned the following year, with new signings including François Zoko and James Berrett, to win the trophy in 2011. The following season started successfully for the Cumbrians with Rory Loy, Lee Miller and Zoko all forming a hugely successful strike-partnership. They sustained a considerable play-off push throughout the season. Having occupied 6th place (final play-off position) for a period of the season, a dip in form towards the end of the seasons saw The Cumbrians miss out by just two points to Stevenage, meaning a successful seasons for the Cumbrians couldn't be rounded off with an appearance in the League One play-offs.

The following season began in disappointing manner. Following a number of heavy defeats the club found themselves drafted into a relegation battle, occupying the final relegation spot for a period of the season. However, a resurgence of form in the New Year following the return of target man Lee Miller, and fellow front-man Rory Loy saw Carlisle string together a number of good results to claw themselves clear of the relegation zone, eventually finishing the season in 17th position. The club retained Greg Abbott as manager, offering a 1-year extension to his current deal, whilst also extending assistant Graham Kavanagh's contract for another season.

The 2013-14 season started in disastrous style, with a 5–1 home defeat against Leyton Orient in which striker Lee Miller was sent off for violent conduct. A 4–0 drubbing away at Bradford City followed, before another 4–0 defeat at the hands of Coventry at home, before scraping points against Colchester and Brentford. Another heavy defeat in the League Cup followed as Championship side Leicester City secured a 5–2 victory at Brunton Park, before a narrow 1–0 home defeat to Port Vale spelled the end of Abbott's 5-year reign as United manager, just 2 points from 6 games had been the final straw for the club's Board.

2013–present: Custodian ownership
Following Abbott's sacking, assistant manager Graham Kavanagh was installed as caretaker manager, appointed on a permanent basis on 30 September 2013, signing a two-year contract.
Following three-straight League Wins under Kavanagh and some much improved performances, Kavanagh was installed as permanent boss on a two-year deal. In May 2014, Carlisle were relegated, ending an 8-year spell in the third tier having finished 22nd following a disastrous run of results under Kavanagh, meaning the club would compete in League Two for the 2014–15 league season. Kavanagh removed assistant manager Davie Irons from his post as assistant manager early in pre-season as work to overhaul the playing, and backroom staff was underway in Kavanagh's project to turn Carlisle into a top footballing side.

Graham Kavanagh was sacked in September 2014, following a winless start to the season, a 5–0 away defeat to newly promoted Cambridge United proved to be the final straw; alongside a record run of 15 league matches without a win for the club, ultimately culminating in Kavanagh being removed from his role as manager. He left the club having one of the worst records of any manager in the club's history, with a win ratio of only 25% and a relegation under his name. In September 2014, Keith Curle was appointed as Carlisle United manager, along with his former assistant Colin West. They signed a deal until the end of the 2015–16 season.

Curle got off to a flying start, winning his first full-match as manager 1–0 against fellow strugglers Tranmere Rovers. This was followed by a 3–0 victory over rivals Hartlepool United, and another home 3–0 victory against Stevenage. The run of form lifted Carlisle from the foot of the table, and out of the relegation zone. The surge in form soon petered out however, and United again found themselves near the trapdoor of the Football League's basement division. 7 points from 3 games towards the back end of the season meant that Carlisle secured their Football League safety with 2 games to spare, following a 2–0 home victory over promotion-chasing Plymouth Argyle, just 4 days after a courageous 1–1 draw away at Burton Albion. The next season was a much better one but not enough for a promotion push, with the team finishing 10th. A highlight of the season was a visit at Anfield for the third round of the League Cup and a famous 1–1 draw against giants Liverpool, but lost 3–2 on penalties.

The first half of the 2016–17 season was excellent for the club, with just one loss (against then-bottom Newport County) in their first 23 league fixtures. The play-offs seemed almost guaranteed. However a disastrous sequence followed, with only 4 wins in the next 21 games including 10 losses resulting in a drop from 2nd to 10th with only two games remaining. But a comeback home win against Newport County combined with favourable results elsewhere were enough to put them back into the play-off positions. Then, another comeback at play-off bound Exeter City in the last game proved enough for a final position of 6th, and a play-off semi-final showdown with the same opponent. However, Exeter beat them 6–5 on aggregate to condemn Carlisle to another season in League Two.

Keith Curle left Carlisle United at the end of the 2017–18 League Two season after over four years in charge. He was replaced by John Sheridan. In January 2019, John Sheridan resigned as the Carlisle manager in order to become manager of National League side Chesterfield with the club in the last play-off position. Sheridan was replaced by Steven Pressley who saw the Cumbrians finish the 2018–19 season in 11th place.

In November 2019, Pressley was sacked with the Cumbrians in 19th place. Pressley was replaced by Chris Beech. The 2019–20 season was cancelled due to the COVID-19 pandemic with the Cumbrians in a disappointing 18th place. Chris Beech then set about the task of re-building the squad following the disappointing 18th-placed finish, bringing in a raft of new signings and developing a new football system. The 2020–21 season started in positive fashion for the blues with the club sitting top of the table at Christmas, resulting in Beech signing a new contract extension. However, a poor run of form saw the side slip from top to 14th in the table, nevertheless, results picked up towards the end of the season seeing the Cumbrians finish in 10th place.

The 2020–21 close season saw a number of first team regulars depart the blues including club captain Nick Anderton, goalkeeper Paul Farman and winger Omari Patrick. Beech set about again rebuilding his squad for the 2021–22 season to try and mount a further promotion push. In October 2021, manager Chris Beech was sacked due to a poor run of form for Carlisle and replaced by Keith Millen. However, Millen could not turn the blues' season around and after a 3–0 defeat at home by Swindon Town and a run of bad results Keith Millen was sacked in February 2022. Paul Simpson was announced as the new manager the same day. "Simmo" led the blues to 8 wins, 1 draw and 6 defeats which was enough to pull the club from the relegation zone and keep Carlisle in the football league finishing 20th place.

Colours and badge

Upon the decision to change the name of Shaddongate F.C. to Carlisle United in 1904 the club also changed their shirt colours from gold and navy stripes to blue. In 1907 white shorts were introduced and since then various combinations of blue and white have been used by the club. In 1973 the first shirt to feature a sportswear sponsor was worn by United. Made by Admiral, the shirt was based on an earlier Birmingham City shirt and was the first to feature red detailing. Since then red detailing became a common feature on Carlisle shirts.

The first evidence of Carlisle wearing a crest dates to the 1950/51 season, first adorning it in a FA Cup tie against Arsenal. The design itself was based on the city's own coat of arms which was registered at the College of Arms in 1924. The crest itself may have been derived from Sir William de Carlyell of Cumberland, in the reign of Edward II, who bore a red cross. The supporting red wyverns to either side of the shield are a symbol of the British Kingdom of Cumbria. The motto on the underlying scroll reads: ‘Be just and fear not’, which is a quote from Shakespeare's 'Henry VIII'.

Carlisle were often referred to as 'The Foxes' due to the local connection with huntsman John Peel. In 1970 the club badge changed to reflect this and featured a golden fox jumping over the abbreviation C.U.F.C. The fox further became part of the club's image with a mounted stuffed fox named Olga (an anagram of "goal") which is traditionally carried onto the pitch by the mascot before the match. Later versions of this badge featured a fox's head with a castle (representing Carlisle Castle) and a fox jumping through a ring of stars, somewhat resembling the European Union emblem.

Since 1995 the club has reverted to using the city's coat of arms. However the club still sell merchandise with branding similar to their former fox badge and the club mascot (who is now Olga the Fox also) still carries the stuffed fox onto the pitch.

Sponsorship
Stobart Group, which is a locally based and founded business, had been the club's main shirt sponsor since 1995. Before 2007 the shirt displayed the 'Eddie Stobart' name associated with the haulage arm of the business (with the exception of the 1997–2000 shirt), in 2007 this changed to just 'Stobart' in order to reflect the wider company. The Stobart deal ended for the 2014-15 season, ending one of the longest-running sponsorship deals in English football.

The Stobart Group have been strong supporters of the club in general also. In 2010, to celebrate the company's 40th anniversary, the group bought 4,000 tickets for the League One game against Rochdale and gave them away to the general public. On 3 April 2011 Carlisle United wore black armbands in the Football League Trophy final in respect of Edward Stobart (son of Eddie), who died three days earlier.

Source:

Stadium

As Shaddongate United the club played at two grounds, Millholme Bank, to the south of the city, and Devonshire Park, where Trinity School now stands. In 1909, five years after becoming Carlisle United, the club moved to Brunton Park and have been residents ever since.

The stadium has a capacity of 18,202 and comprises both seated and terraced areas. The four stands are known as Main (West) Stand & Paddock, the East Stand, the "Waterworks" Petteril Stand and the Warwick Road End which usually hosts the most vocal supporters on match days. In the past the stadium has been the victim of severe flooding and a fire which burned down the wooden grandstand which stood until 1953.

In 2011, a plan was introduced to move to a 12,000 capacity all-seater stadium to be built in the Kingmoor Park area of the city which was to be locally known as project Blue Yonder. Though considerably smaller than Brunton Park, the new ground could be upgraded to a larger capacity if demand was met. An extension of this 12,000 capacity is thought to rely on the club achieving promotion to the Sky Bet Championship. The proposals have received mixed responses from Carlisle fans. There has since been no news as to whether the project has any advancement.

In December and January of the 2015–16 season, Carlisle played their home games at Deepdale in Preston, Bloomfield Road in Blackpool and Ewood Park in Blackburn, as Brunton Park recovered from flooding caused by Storm Desmond.

In December 2021, the club announced that the stadium capacity would be temporarily reduced to 9,999, after the government required attendees at events with a capacity of greater than 10,000 to show Covid certification.

Ownership
Carlisle United operates through the limited company Carlisle United Association Football Club (1921) Ltd which is currently controlled by local businessmen Andrew Jenkins, Steven Pattison and John Nixon, who have a controlling 74.6% stake in the club's holding company, CUFC Holdings Ltd. A minority (25.4%) stake is held by The United Trust, formed by supporters in 2001. Jenkins is the owner of local business Pioneer Foods while Pattison owns local Hardware company Carlisle Glass – Longhorn. Jenkins has been involved with Carlisle United for over fifty years and has served in various roles within the backroom during previous ownership. Nixon is former MD of Pirelli Tyres. Jenkins became the majority shareholder ahead of John Nixon and Steven Pattison, through the transfer of shares from former owner David Allen.

Allen, the owner of a local accountancy agency, left the board acrimoniously in 2009 when he made public a feud with fellow owners on the board stating "Unfortunately, a lot of people perceive elements within Brunton Park’s hierarchy as an old boys’ club that is not receptive of change. I am unhappy being associated with that as it is not my style either personally or professionally." Since Allen left the club has gone from strength to strength having two Wembley finals under their belt including winning the JPT in April 2011 also posting healthy profits. Carlisle United released plans to move to a modern all seater stadium, however these plans fell through. Recent years have seen the club stagnate and decline both in terms of league position and attendances. The club has recently gone through its longest period in history without promotion, the last being the 2005-06 season.

In 1992 property developer Michael Knighton bought the club which was then playing in Division Four, the lowest tier of the Football League. Then began a ten-year ownership in which much of the talk around the club concerned Knighton himself. At one point he was even featured in the local paper claiming to have seen a UFO, local paper the News and Star ran the story with the headline: 'Knighton: Aliens Spoke To Me'.

In 1997 Knighton dismissed popular manager Mervyn Day, who had won promotion to the Second Division and the Football League Trophy earlier that year. Knighton placed himself in charge of the club's management with the uncredited help of Dave Wilkes and John Halpin. The club was relegated to the English fourth tier that season and only narrowly avoided losing Football League status due to a last minute goal by goalkeeper Jimmy Glass in 1999. Knighton became increasingly unpopular with the fans in the following years and the supporters' 'United Trust' was formed to push for better ownership, this came in the form of John Courtenay after a seven month battle in July 2002, ending Michael Knighton's controversial 10 year reign

Supporters and rivalries
The main area of Carlisle support can be found within and around Carlisle itself and, due to being the only professional football club for a long distance, it attracts fans from across the county of Cumbria, South West Scotland and parts of West Northumberland. The club's supporters are known as the Blue Army. The most vocal supporters on match days reside in Brunton Park's Warwick Road End, known affectionately to the fans as 'The Warwick.' In addition to generic English football chants Carlisle's supporters sing "Proud to be a Cumbrian", "Super Carlisle from the North" and an adapted version of Peggy March's, "I Will Follow Him".

Carlisle's traditional rivals are Workington and Barrow. However, both clubs were voted out of the Football League in the 1970s and consequently competitive matches between the teams have been rare. Barrow were promoted back to the Football League in 2020, reinstating competitive matches between the two teams. Prior to 2008, the club's nearest professional football club was Gretna, owned by Carlisle United fan, Brooks Mileson. Gretna were residents of the Scottish Football League however and, therefore, the chance of meeting in competitive competition remained highly unlikely. Gretna was eventually liquidated in 2008.

In 2012, market research company FFC surveyed fans of every Football League club across the country to find who they consider their main rivals to be.  Carlisle United fans were unusually shown to consider the more distant Preston North End, Hartlepool United and Middlesbrough as their main rivals. This is most likely explained by the fact that the survey did not include the option of choosing non-league clubs.

Players

Current squad

Out on loan

Player of the Season 
Carlisle's Player of the Season award is voted for by the club's supporters.

Notable players

The Carlisle United Hall of Fame 
"A selection of the people we have all watched from the terraces, often in awe, through the ages here at Brunton Park." - carlisleunited.co.uk

Club management

Coaching positions

Notable managers

The following managers have all achieved honours with Carlisle United.
(n/a) = Information not available

Honours and achievements
Football League Second Division / Championship (second tier)
3rd place promotion (1): 1973–74
Football League Third Division / League One (third tier)
Champions (1): 1964–65
2nd place promotion (1): 1981–82
Football League Fourth Division / League Two (4th tier)
Champions (2): 1994–95, 2005–06
2nd place promotion (1): 1963–64
3rd place promotion (1): 1996–97
4th place promotion (1): 1961–62
Conference National (fifth tier)
Play-off winners (1): 2004–05
Lancashire Combination Division One
Runners-up (1): 1907–08
Lancashire Combination Division Two
Champions (1): 1906–07
North Eastern League
Champions (1): 1921–22
Runners-up (1): 1927–28
Football League Trophy
Winners (2): 1996–97, 2010–11
Runners-up (4): 1994–95, 2002–03, 2005–06, 2009–10
Cumberland Senior Cup
Winners (29): 1901–02, 1902–03, 1904–05, 1908–09, 1910–11, 1912–13, 1921–22, 1923–24, 1927–28, 1928–29, 1929–30, 1930–31, 1931–32, 1932–33, 1933–34, 1938–39, 1939–40, 1979–80,  1989–90, 1992–93, 2001–02, 2004–05, 2007–08, 2010–11, 2011–12, 2012–13, 2014–15, 2018–19
Runners-up (13): 1906–07, 1909–10, 1913–14, 1914–15, 1934–35, 1936–37. 1937–38, 1984–85, 1993–94, 1999–00, 2002–03, 2003–04, 2006–07

League history
To date Carlisle United have played 82 seasons in the Football League, their relegation in 2004 and reinstatement the following year remains the only departure from the Football League since the club was first admitted in 1928 (excluding wartime). United are currently the only club to have reached the final of the Football League Trophy on six occasions. This, alongside their two wins, makes them the most successful club in the competition's history. The club's highest achievement outside of cup competitions came in 1974 when the club was promoted to the first tier of English football and spent a short period of time at the top of the division. Carlisle still remains the smallest location in England, by local population, to have had a resident top-flight football team since 1906.

Club records

Highest League Position: 22nd in Football League Division One (1st tier), 1974–75
Best FA Cup Performance: Quarter-finals, 1974–75
Best Football League Cup Performance: Semi-finals, 1969–70
Best Football League Trophy Performance: Winners, 1996–97, 2010–11
Best FA Trophy Performance: 5th Round, 2004–05
Best Anglo-Italian Cup Performance: Group Stage, 1972
Record Victory: 8–0 vs. Hartlepools United Division Three North, 1 September 1928
Record Defeat: 1–11 vs. Hull City Division Three North, 14 January 1939
Most League Goals: 113, Division 4, 1963–64
Most Wins In a Row: 8 Wins, 1 October 2016 to 9 November 2016
Most league goals in a season: Jimmy McConnell, 42 goals, 1928–29
Most league goals in total: Jimmy McConnell, 126 goals, 1928–32
Most league appearances: Alan Ross, 466, 1963–79
Most capped player: Dean Furman, 58 caps, South Africa 2020–21
Record transfer fee: Joe Garner, £140,000 from Blackburn Rovers
Record sale: Matt Jansen, £1.5 million to Crystal Palace

Notes

References

External links

 
Association football clubs established in 1904
1904 establishments in England
Football clubs in Cumbria
Sport in Carlisle, Cumbria
Football clubs in England
Lancashire Combination
North Eastern League
English Football League clubs
National League (English football) clubs
EFL Trophy winners